The Culpepper Cattle Co.  or Dust, Sweat and Gunpowder (Australian title) is a 1972 Revisionist Western film produced by Twentieth Century Fox. It was directed by Dick Richards and starred Billy Green Bush as Frank Culpepper and Gary Grimes as Ben Mockridge. This was the first credited film for Jerry Bruckheimer, for which he received an associate producer credit. Its tagline is "How many men do you have to kill before you become the great American cowboy?" and also "The boy from Summer of '42 becomes a man on the cattle drive of 1866", which references a similar coming of age film starring Gary Grimes. The film is typical of the "hyper-realism" of many early 1970s revisionist westerns. It is particularly noted for its grainy photography and use of sepia toning in some scenes.

Plot

Ben Mockridge (Gary Grimes) is a young man proud of his $4 handgun and enamored of "cowboyin. He asks Frank Culpepper (Billy Green Bush) if he can join his cattle drive to Fort Lewis, Colorado. Culpepper (a reformed gunslinger) reluctantly agrees and sends Ben to the cook (Raymond Guth) to be his "little Mary".

Ben quickly discovers that the adults have little interest in young'ns, and no interest in "showing him the ropes". Culpepper nevertheless assigns Ben tasks the greenhorn handles poorly—or simply fails at—repeatedly causing serious trouble.

After rustlers stampede the herd, Culpepper tracks them to a box canyon. When the rustlers' leader (Royal Dano) demands 50 cents a head for having rounded up and taken care of the cattle, Culpepper will have none of it. He and his hands kill the rustlers, not hesitating to gun down disarmed men, or repeatedly shoot anyone still moving. They lose four of their own in the fight.

Culpepper directs Ben to a cantina a day's ride off, to find Russ Caldwell. Before he can reach the cantina, Ben is accosted by trappers who take his horse and gun. Once Ben finds Caldwell (Geoffrey Lewis), he and three of his buddies agree to join the drive. When they cross the trappers' path, there is no parlaying—they immediately kill the trappers and take their possessions.

When Ben stands night watch, he's unprepared for a one-eyed man (Gregory Sierra) trying to steal the horses. Instead of immediately shooting him, Ben lets the man distract him with his talk, and is overcome by another thief. Culpepper is outraged at Ben's stupidity.

The horse theft "tears it", and Culpepper decides to toss Ben on a stage coach, regardless of where it's headed. When Culpepper & Co. enter a town where they hope to buy horses and send off the greenhorn, they stop at a saloon, where Ben recognizes one of the patrons as the one-eyed horse thief. Another shootout ensues, with Ben "redeeming" himself by killing the bartender as the latter reaches for his shotgun. As before, Culpepper's adversaries wind up dead, an unlikely survivor directing Culpepper to the horses.

When Ben handles Caldwell's gun without his permission, the touchy Caldwell goes into a snit, and knocks Ben to the ground. When one of the hands calls Caldwell an SOB for striking Ben, Caldwell demands a gun fight to reclaim his "honor". The hand decides it is not worth the trouble and leaves the drive. "You cost me a good man, boy," fumes Culpepper, warning him to "make himself small" for the remainder of the drive.

When they reach an area with grass and water, Culpepper leaves the cattle to graze, taking Caldwell and his men into town to look for the landowner to pay him. Ben follows them, initially to buy food for the cook, but joins them in a bar for a drink, where they prod him into a session with a backroom prostitute. The owner of the land, Thornton Pierce (John McLiam), tells Culpepper he should have asked first before letting the cattle graze, and demands $200 as down-payment simply for having trespassed. This time, Culpepper & Co. are outgunned, and forced to surrender their sidearms, which they view as a symbolic castration.

Moving out the cattle, Culpepper & Co. encounter a group of religious "pilgrims", led by Nathaniel Green (Anthony James), who invites them to stay and water their cattle. He says God has led his party here, and they intend to settle.

Not surprisingly, Pierce and his thugs show up, claiming "this land is mine", and gives everyone—Green and his people included—an hour to get off. Green is convinced Culpepper was sent by God to help. Culpepper responds that Green need only leave to be safe, which is what he intends to do, as it is less than two weeks to Fort Lewis, and selling his cattle is all he cares about.

Ben decides to stay, feeling he can help in some unspecified manner. He reveals that he safely hid his gun and belt from Pierce's men earlier during the barroom ambush. As Culpepper & Co. ride off, Caldwell and his three friends, their consciences (and lust for revenge) getting the better of them, return to defend Green & party from Pierce, to Culpepper's exasperation. Nonetheless, Culpepper leaves them behind to drive his cattle. In the ensuing shootout, everyone in the Caldwell and Pierce parties—except Ben—is killed.

Revealing his hypocrisy and ingratitude, Green tells Ben that they are not going to stay after all, as the ground has been stained with blood. "God never intended us to stay—he was only testing us." An angry Ben forces them to bury the four bodies of his friends, then discards his gun and rides off to parts unknown.

Cast

 Gary Grimes as Ben Mockridge
 Billy "Green" Bush as Frank Culpepper
 Luke Askew as Luke
 Bo Hopkins as Dixie Brick
 Geoffrey Lewis as Russ
 Raymond Guth as Cook
 Wayne Sutherlin as Missoula
 Matt Clark as Pete
 Anthony James as Nathaniel
 Charles Martin Smith as Tim Slater
 Gregory Sierra Rustler

Historical accuracy

The Culpepper Cattle Co. has been praised for its attention to detail and period atmosphere. A subtle example is seen when Frank Culpepper leans against a water barrel and his arm above the wrist is exposed—it is white, untanned. People rarely took off any clothing in public (there is a comic moment when the cook is embarrassed to be seen with his shirt off), and the idea of an "all-over" tan would have been absurd, if not incomprehensible. (Only working folk had a tan.) Cowboys were "fish-belly white" over most of their bodies.

The opening title sequence mixes genuine period photographs with sepia-tinted posed images of the cast members.

The story is almost violent, but this has to be seen in the context of the offenses against Frank Culpepper and his party. These included horse and cattle theft, which were usually punishable by hanging. As there was no practical way to haul the thieves into court, Culpepper was justified in dispensing immediate "justice", however brutal. Culpepper's final act of justice is to wipe out the evil agro-capitalist (the villain in scores of Westerns) and his horde.

By contemporary standards, the grass-fed cattle are rather scrawny, as fattening them up on corn had not become general practice. Even if it had, there would have been little point in adding weight to animals who would only "walk it off" on a long drive. The 1866 date of the story is plausible. This was the same year Goodnight and Loving made their first long cattle drive.

The film's principal anachronism is showing most of the cowhands with beards. Contemporary photos indicate that, while cowboys often had mustaches (sometimes quite fancy), beards were not common—one out of twenty cowboys, perhaps. This was unusual in an era (extending to the end of the 19th century) where a high percentage of men took pride in having full beards.

The film incorrectly mixes in scenes of topography and vegetation found only in the climatic zone of southwestern Arizona. The location of the cattle drive is between "Texas" and Fort Lewis, Colorado (located in southwest Colorado near Durango). There are scenes of cattle being driven by Saguaro cactus which only occur in the Sonoran Desert of southwest Arizona. This Arizona scenery is 350 miles off-course of a probable route that would run between west Texas and southwest Colorado. The scenery surrounding the Eaves Movie Ranch (outside Santa Fe, NM) is typical of the landscape and vegetation that would have been common along the fictional route.

The firearms used are almost all anachronisms in an 1866 setting. With the exception of Ben Mockridge's 1850s-era percussion-cap pistol, the other pistols and rifles date from the early 1870s to the mid-1890s.

Another anachronism is a pressure lantern (invented in the late 1890s) visible in one bar scene.

Awards
Gregory Prentiss and Eric Bercovici were nominated for best original screenplay by the Writers Guild of America.

Trivia
The cowboys' departure scene bringing the herd is a clear tribute to Howard Hawks' Red River.

See also
 List of American films of 1972

References

1972 films
1972 Western (genre) films
American Western (genre) films
1970s English-language films
Films directed by Dick Richards
20th Century Fox films
Films scored by Jerry Goldsmith
Films scored by Tom Scott
Revisionist Western (genre) films
1972 directorial debut films
1970s American films